This is the Filmography for the Pakistani Actress Reema Khan from Film debut in Bulandi in 1990 to her 'Mega Hits' such as Nikah (1998), Mujhe Chand Chahiye (2000) and One Two Ka One (2006) to her own directed movies such as: Koi Tujh Sa Kahan (2005) and Love Mein Ghum (2011).

Films

Actress filmographies
Pakistani filmographies